Houtman or De Houtman is a Dutch surname. Translating as "(the) woodman", the origin of the name may be toponymic ("from the woods") or occupational (lumberman, carpenter, etc.). Notable people with the surname include:

 Cornelis de Houtman (1565–1599), Dutch explorer who discovered a new sea route from Europe to Indonesia
 Frederick de Houtman (1571–1627), Dutch explorer who sailed along the Western coast of Australia to Batavia
  (1917–1944), Dutch  resistance member murdered during World War II
 Marques Houtman (born 1979), Cape Verdean American basketball point guard
 Peter Houtman (born 1957), Dutch football striker
 Rinus Houtman (born 1942), Dutch Reformed Political Party politician
Anne M. Houtman, American academic administrator

See also 
 Houtman Abrolhos, Wast Australian island chain named after Frederick de Houtman
 10650 Houtman, main-belt asteroid named after Cornelis de Houtman
 Hautman, surname

References 

Dutch-language surnames
Occupational surnames
Dutch toponymic surnames

de:Houtman
nl:Houtman
ru:Хаутман